Happy Camp (Karuk: athithúf-vuunupma) is a census-designated place (CDP) in Siskiyou County, California in the United States.  Its population is 905 as of the 2020 census, down from 1,190 from the 2010 census.

The shortest route to Oregon, over the Grey Back pass, is a seasonal summer road and is not cleared or maintained in snowy conditions. The Forest Service, located in Happy Camp on SR 96, provides road closure information.

Name
Happy Camp was so named by miners in the early days of prosperity. It has frequently been noted on lists of unusual place names.  H.C. Chester, who interviewed Jack Titus in 1882–83, states that Titus named the camp because his partner James Camp, upon arriving there, exclaimed, "This is the happiest day in my life." Redick McKee mentions the camp on November 8, 1851, as "Mr Roache's Happy Camp" at the place known as Murderer's Bar. (Indian Report 1853:178)

Geography
Happy Camp sits on the Klamath River and a nexus of creeks including Elk Creek, Little Grider Creek, Indian Creek, Doolittle Creek, Ikes Creek, Deer Lick Creek and Cade Creek.

The town of Happy Camp is also known as the "Gateway to the Marbles".  There are many trail heads for this Wilderness Area within  of the town for which the U.S. Forest Service provides trail information.  The Marble Mountains cover thousands of acres, and contain almost a hundred lakes.  Among the most interesting lakes are Spirit Lake, which contains a luminescent chemical and has been seen to "glow" in the dark; Ukonom Lake, which is very large and beautiful even though the area is recovering from fire damage; and the Green and Blue Granite Lakes, where trout swim in the cold and clear waters. Deer, bear, elk, and mountain lion are common in the Wilderness Area.

Demographics

The 2010 United States Census reported that Happy Camp had a population of 1,190. The racial makeup of Happy Camp was 814 (68.4%) White, 2 (0.2%) African American, 277 (23.3%) Native American, 7 (0.6%) Asian, 1 (0.1%) Pacific Islander, 18 (1.5%) from other races, and 71 (6.0%) from two or more races. Hispanic or Latino of any race were 95 persons (8.0%).

The Census reported that 1,190 people (100% of the population) lived in households, 0 (0%) lived in non-institutionalized group quarters, and 0 (0%) were institutionalized.

There were 525 households, out of which 129 (24.6%) had children under the age of 18 living in them, 208 (39.6%) were opposite-sex married couples living together, 63 (12.0%) had a female householder with no husband present, 26 (5.0%) had a male householder with no wife present.  There were 63 (12.0%) unmarried opposite-sex partnerships, and 5 (1.0%) same-sex married couples or partnerships. 175 households (33.3%) were made up of individuals, and 67 (12.8%) had someone living alone who was 65 years of age or older. The average household size was 2.27.  There were 297 families (56.6% of all households); the average family size was 2.84.

The population was spread out, with 238 people (20.0%) under the age of 18, 98 people (8.2%) aged 18 to 24, 232 people (19.5%) aged 25 to 44, 428 people (36.0%) aged 45 to 64, and 194 people (16.3%) who were 65 years of age or older.  The median age was 47.3 years. For every 100 females, there were 107.0 males.  For every 100 females age 18 and over, there were 110.2 males.

The homeowner vacancy rate was 3.4%; the rental vacancy rate was 8.0%.  677 people (56.9% of the population) lived in owner-occupied housing units and 513 people (43.1%) lived in rental housing units.

The community is the home of the Bigfoot Jamboree, an annual festival put on by the Happy Camp Community Council. Happy Camp is along the "Bigfoot Scenic Byway," an 89-mile stretch of California State Route 96 named by the United States Forest Service. The town is the home of an 18-foot-tall Bigfoot statue made out of recycled metal.

Climate
As is typical of California, Happy Camp has a mediterranean climate. It is marked by very hot summer days, being shielded in the valley behind the mountains from the cooling Pacific influence affecting nearby coastal locations. The winters are much cooler and snowier than in inland locations further south, albeit still very mild compared to areas to the east of the continent. The dry and hot summers make the surrounding forest prone to wildfires, as seen during the 2014 Happy Camp Complex Fire, which took months to extinguish and burned nearly to the Oregon border. The high winter rainfall, however, keeps the area greener than its summer climate would suggest.

Karuk Tribe
The Karuk Tribe is headquartered in Happy Camp.

United States Forest Service
The U.S. Forest Service maintains an office in town. Happy Camp is the administration site for the Happy Camp/Oak Knoll Ranger Districts of the Klamath National Forest.

Education
 Happy Camp Elementary School
 Happy Camp High School
 Jefferson High Continuation School
 College of the Siskiyous - Happy Camp

Government

Klamath controversy
Gold prospectors, conservation groups, the California Department of Fish and Game, the U.S. Forest Service, and the Karuk, Hupa (Hoopa) and Yurok tribes are at odds with each other over what constitutes fair and ethical use of the river. The range of issues includes property rights, endangered species, and Native American civil rights.

Notable people
 
Daniel R. Hokanson, lieutenant general in the United States Army.
 Jetty Rae, musician and independent artist, lived in Happy Camp during her childhood. 
 Ricky Ray, pro-football quarterback, was born in Happy Camp and went to Shasta High and Shasta College.

References

External links

 
 Happy Camp Chamber of Commerce
 Happy Camp News
 Virtual tour of the State of Jefferson Scenic Byway along the Klamath River.

Census-designated places in Siskiyou County, California
Census-designated places in California